The Warembari River or Warembori River is a river in Western New Guinea.

See also
List of rivers of Western New Guinea
Warembori language

References

Rivers of Papua (province)